Blocks to Robots: Learning with Technology in the Early Childhood Classroom (2008) is an educational guide book by Marina Umaschi Bers that introduces the idea of learning with technology in the early childhood classroom.  
      
Research shows that attitudes about science, math, and technology start to form during early education. This book shows how to successfully use technology in the classroom, using a constructivist approach to teaching and learning. Bers focusses on robotic manipulatives that allow children to explore complex concepts in a concrete and fun way.

Reviews

References

External links
DevTech Research group
TangibleK Project

2008 non-fiction books
Robotics books